Attatha metaleuca is a moth of the family Noctuidae first described by George Hampson in 1913. It is found in Burkina Faso, Ivory Coast, Eritrea, Ethiopia, Mauritania, Nigeria, Saudi Arabia, Tanzania, Togo and Yemen.

References

Catocalinae
Insects of West Africa
Moths of Africa